The 2023 Arizona Wildcats baseball team represents the University of Arizona during the 2023 NCAA Division I baseball season. The Wildcats play their home games for the 12th season at Hi Corbett Field. The team is coached by Chip Hale in his 2nd season at Arizona.

Previous season 
The Wildcats finished the 2022 season with a record of 39–25 (16–14 Conf.), good for a 5th place conference finish. In the inaugural Pac-12 Conference Baseball Tournament in Scottsdale, AZ, the Wildcats defeated Oregon and Arizona State but lost twice to eventual champion Stanford to finish in 4th place. The team subsequently was selected to the postseason for a second consecutive season for the first time since 2016–2017. They were placed in the Coral Gables Regional where they went 2-2, eliminating both Canisius and host #6 Miami but losing twice to Ole Miss to end their season.

Preseason 
During the offseason, the Wildcats participated in 4 fall exhibition games. On October 6 the team participated in the Mexican Baseball Fiesta held at Tucson's Kino Veterans Memorial Stadium, playing the Naranjeros de Hermosillo of the Mexican Pacific League to a 6–6 tie. Arizona next played Pima Community College on October 15 at Hi Corbett Field in a game in which the score was not released. The Wildcats concluded the preseason on October 22 with 11-6 and 5-4 wins over UNLV in a doubleheader at Hi Corbett Field.

Personnel

Roster

Coaches

Opening day

Schedule and results

References 

2023 season
2023 season
Arizona Wildcats
Wildcats